St. Sebastian's Church is the seat of the Roman Catholic Diocese of Kalutara. Church branch of Catholic Church in Sri Lanka. It was established on 20 January 1844. Annual feast is 3rd Sunday of January.

St. Sebastian's Church featured on 5 rupees worth of postal Christmas stamps were issued by the Sri Lankan government in 2007.

References 

1881 establishments in Asia
19th-century establishments in Ceylon
Roman Catholic churches completed in 1881
Roman Catholic cathedrals in Sri Lanka
Roman Catholic churches in Sri Lanka
19th-century Roman Catholic church buildings in Sri Lanka